Mahatma Gandhi University (MGU), commonly referred to as MG University, is a state owned public university headquartered in Kottayam in the state of Kerala, India. It was established on 2 October 1983 on Gandhi Jayanti day. Mahatma Gandhi University (formerly Gandhiji University) has been approved by University Grants Commission (UGC) and accredited (A) by the National Assessment and Accreditation Council of India. The university has around 300 affiliated colleges spread over five districts in central Kerala.

Academics
The university offers around 300 academic programmers (Bachelor's, Master's, Doctoral degrees) in the fields of Pure and Applied Sciences, Technology, Paramedical Studies, Nursing, Management, Law, Engineering, Gandhian Thought, development studies, International Relations, Inter disciplinary Integrated Master of Sciences, Politics, Physics, Nano Science, Disability Studies, Rehabilitation Sciences, Special Education, Psychology, Behavioral Medicine, Tourism, Journalism, Chemical Sciences, Polymer Engineering, Hospital Administration, Environmental Sciences, Disaster Management, Business Studies, Commerce, Economics, Arts, Pedagogical Studies, Hotel and Hospitality Management, Catering Science, Food and Nutrition, Computer Science, Biotechnology, Geoinformatics among others. Average annual student enrollment is between 17,000 and 18,000 (2013 statistics).

Administration

Prof.Sabu Thomas (Professor, School of Chemical Sciences, Mahatma Gandhi University) serves as the Vice-Chancellor. Prof.C.T Aravindakumar serves as the Pro Vice-Chancellor. The registrar is  Prof. (Dr.) Prakashkumar B and Dr. Sreejith C.M.  holds the charge of Controller of Examinations.  Sri. Biju Mathew acts as the Finance Officer.

The university is funded by the University Grants Commission and Government of Kerala. It is a member of the AIU and the ACU. Association of Commonwealth Universities represents over 480 universities from Commonwealth countries.

Affiliated colleges

Location
The university campus is in the Priyadarsini Hills, Athirampuzha 13 kilometers from Kottayam Railway Station and 4 kilometers from Ettumanoor. To reach the campus take the deviation from M.C. Road at Ettumanoor or Gandhi Nagar. The nearest airport is Cochin International Airport situated at Nedumbassery, Cochin which is about 79  km away. Private buses to Ernakulam starting from the Nagampadom bus stand at the northern end of the railway platform at Kottayam stop at the university. It is located 13  km away from the city of Kottayam.

Schools and departments
 School of Behavioral Science
 School of Bio-Science
 School of Chemical Science
 School of Computer Sciences
 School of Distance Education
 School of Environmental Science
 School of Gandhian Thought and Development Studies
 School of Indian Legal Thought
 School of International Relation & Politics
 School of Printing & Publishing
 School of Letters
 School of Pedagogical Sciences
 School of Physical Education & Sports Science
 School of Pure and applied physics
 School of Management & Business Studies
 School of Social Science
 School of Technology & Applied Sciences
 School of Tourism Studies
 Department of Life-Long Learning & Extension
 National Institute of Plant Science Technology
 Inter University Center For Studies in Science of Music
 Centre For High Performance Computing 
 Inter University Centre for Disability Studies
 International and Inter University Centre for Nano science and Nanotechnology
 Institute for Integrated Programmers and Research in Basic Sciences (IIRBS)
 Inter University Centre for Biomedical Research
 Inter University Instrumentation Centre
 Advanced Molecular Materials Research Centre
 Inter University Centre for Social Science Research and Extension
 Advanced Centre of Environmental Studies and Sustainable Development
 Centre for English Language and Communication Skills
 K.n. Raj study centre for planning and centre -state financial relations

CARLIS 
Centre for Advanced Research in Library and Information Sciences (CARLIS) was established in 2010 for research on technologies that can transfer existing knowledge from traditional media to future proof digital media for the networked society.

CARLIS covers two main areas; Library Science and Information Science along with their applications using technologies developed in allied areas. CARLIS started Offering PhD programmes in 2010 and the areas of research are content management, digital archiving, multimedia resources, information administration, information economics, information infrastructures, IPR issues, knowledge warehousing, language technologies, Open Access protocols, resource sharing networks etc.

It is envisaged as a national centre and will have initially an Advisory Council with experts from India and abroad, an Honorary Director, experts from different areas in knowledge management as faculty. The research by the team associated to CARLIS has developed the Digital Library package with search mechanisms for Indian scripts used in Gandhi University on line Theses Library the first official Open Access Archive of PhD theses from Indian universities.

Rankings

The Times Higher Education (THE) has ranked MG university amongst the top 500 universities in the World in THE World University Rankings 2023. 

The National Institutional Ranking Framework (NIRF) ranked Mahatma Gandhi University, Kerala 49th overall in India and 30th among universities in 2020.

Notable alumni 

 P. K. Biju
 Linto Joseph
 Dr. Justice Kauser Edappagath
 Kurian Joseph
 Srikant Murali
 Surabhi Lakshmi
 Aprem Mooken
 Nayanthara
 B. Kemal Pasha
 Kandathil Sebastian
 K. M. Tharakan
 Venu Rajamony 
 Vijilesh Karayad
 Eldhose Kunnappilly

See also

 Rajan Gurukkal
Mahatma Gandhi University Library
Mahatma Gandhi University Staff Cricket Club

References

External links

Mahatma Gandhi University: Website of Mahatma Gandhi University

 
Universities and colleges in Dubai
1983 establishments in Kerala
Universities and colleges in Kottayam
Universities in Kerala
Educational institutions established in 1983